"She Is Beyond Good and Evil" is a song by English post-punk band The Pop Group. It was released as a single on March 2, 1979, through Radar Records. This song has been covered by the indie rock musician St. Vincent.

Lyrics 
In discussing the song, Stewart described the lyrics as "being about unconditional love as a revolutionary force -- where idealism and energy mix poetic, existential, and political yearnings with the romantic idea of passing through nihilism and emerging on the other side with something positive, something beyond."

Accolades 

(*) designates unordered lists.

Formats and track listing 
All songs written by The Pop Group.
UK 7" single (ADA 29)
 "She Is Beyond Good and Evil" – 3:23
 "3'38" – 3:38

Personnel 

The Pop Group
 Gareth Sager – saxophone, guitar
 Bruce Smith – drums, percussion
 Mark Stewart – vocals
 Simon Underwood – bass guitar
 John Waddington – guitar

Technical personnel
 Dennis Bovell – production
 George Peckham – mastering

References

External links 
 

1979 songs
1979 debut singles
The Pop Group songs
Radar Records singles
Songs written by Gareth Sager
Songs written by Bruce Smith (musician)
Songs written by Mark Stewart (English musician)